Appalachian may refer to:

 Appalachian Mountains, a major mountain range in eastern United States and Canada
 Appalachian Trail, a hiking trail in the eastern United States 
 The people of Appalachia and their culture
 Appalachian Americans, ethnic group native to Appalachia
 Appalachian English, the variety of English native to Central and Southern Appalachia
 Appalachian music
 Appalachian State University, in Boone, North Carolina

See also
 Appalachia (disambiguation)
 
 Appellation (disambiguation)